Persicula enolae is a species of sea snail, a marine gastropod mollusk, in the family Cystiscidae.

Distribution
This marine species occurs off Western Sahara.

References

enolae
Gastropods described in 2014